Samuel Harris may refer to:

Samuel Harris (boxer) (born 1934), Pakistani Olympic boxer
Samuel Harris (historian) (1682–1733), English clergyman and academic
Samuel Harris (theologian) (1814–1899), American theologian, fifth president of Bowdoin College
Samuel Harris (bailiff) (1815–1905), Manx advocate and philanthropist, High Bailiff of Douglas, Isle of Man
Samuel Harris (Newfoundland merchant) (1850–1926), Newfoundland mariner and merchant
Samuel Henry Harris (1881–1936), Australian surgeon
Samuel Smith Harris (1841–1888), bishop of the Diocese of Michigan
Sammy Harris, American baseball player

See also
 Sam Harris (disambiguation)